This is a list of winners and nominees of the Primetime Emmy Award for Outstanding Contemporary Hairstyling and Outstanding Period and/or Character Hairstyling. Prior to 2020, awards were split between miniseries or movies and ongoing series.

In the following list, the first titles listed in gold are the winners; those not in gold are nominees, which are listed in alphabetical order. The years given are those in which the ceremonies took place:

Winners and nominations

1970s

Outstanding Achievement in Hairstyling

1980s

1990s

2000s

2010s

2020s

Programs with multiple wins

4 awards
 Downton Abbey
 Mad Men

3 wins
 American Crime Story
 American Horror Story
 Dr. Quinn, Medicine Woman

2 wins
 Bridgerton
 Rome
 Tracey Takes On... 
 Westworld

Programs with multiple nominations

9 nominations
 Mad Men

8 nominations
 American Horror Story
 Game of Thrones

7 nominations
 Star Trek: Deep Space Nine

6 nominations
 Star Trek: The Next Generation
 Star Trek: Voyager

5 nominations
 Alias
 Boardwalk Empire
 Downton Abbey
 Dr. Quinn, Medicine Woman

4 nominations
 The Crown
 Deadwood
 Desperate Housewives
 Little House on the Prairie
 The Marvelous Mrs. Maisel

3 nominations
 American Crime Story
 Black-ish
 Buffy the Vampire Slayer
 Dynasty
 Glee
 Homefront
 Pose
 Sex and the City
 Six Feet Under
 Tracey Ullman's State of the Union

2 nominations
 American Dreams
 The Borgias
 Bridgerton
 Carnivàle
 Crime Story
 Fargo
 Genius
 GLOW
 The Handmaid's Tale
 Into the West
 The Knick
 Moonlighting
 Penny Dreadful
 The Politician
 Pushing Daisies
 Rome
 Star Trek: Enterprise
 Stranger Things
 Thirtysomething
 The Tudors
 Ugly Betty
 Westworld
 The Young Indiana Jones Chronicles

Notes

References

Outstanding Hairstyling
Hairdressing
Awards established in 2020